Ben 10: Destroy All Aliens is an American computer-animated superhero television film that premiered on Cartoon Network Asia on March 11, 2012, and in the United States on Cartoon Network March 23, 2012, as part of "Ben 10 Week" which ran from March 19, 2012 – March 24, 2012. The events of the film take place after the final episode of the series. It was officially unveiled at San Diego Comic-Con International 2011. This is Cartoon Network Asia's first film in collaboration with Cartoon Network Studios. It is considered the official three-part finale of the 2D animated series.

This film took place one whole year after the first animated film, Secret of the Omnitrix, making first cousins Ben and Gwen eleven years old, and Grandpa Max sixty-one. It is dedicated to Dulce Lim Chen.

Plot

Ben, Gwen and their paternal grandfather Maxwell Tennyson, spend their evenings fighting aliens on the streets of Bellwood. During a battle that involves chasing and fighting a robotic tank, Ben as Upgrade and Gwen argue about the best way to defeat it, resulting in Gwen utilizing her extraordinarily strong magic to cast a dismantling spell on the tank while Ben is still attached to it. Though this does defeat the tank, unknown to the group, it leads to a malfunction in the Omnitrix.

Later, after a mishap in school where J.T. and Cash lock Ben in his locker, and the Omnitrix accidentally teleports his homework away in a sudden flash of green-pink energy, Ben is grounded by his parents, Carl and Sandra, and forced to stay at home to do a history report. Ben attempts to work on the report before the Omnitrix teleports his laptop away as well. Shortly afterwards, Ben's alien friend Tetrax Shard arrives and tells Ben that Azmuth has asked to meet with him. They go to meet Azmuth, but end up attacked by a To'kustar (Way Big's species). Tetrax and Ben start to fight the alien, who is teleported into the Omnitrix, though neither of them is aware of it. Tetrax decides to take Ben to search for Azmuth and activates a new function on the Omnitrix. Before he can explain this new ability, the ship is attacked and Ben is sucked out into the atmosphere, falling to the ground as Diamondhead.

It is later revealed that the new ability prevents Ben from returning to human form when the Omnitrix times out, simply switching into another one of his alien forms. Ben as Four Arms arrives at Stonehenge, but is confronted and attacked by a Galvanic Mechamorph (Upgrade's species), with abilities of forming weapons and armor from its body and teleportation, who demands to know about the To'kustar that had attacked Ben. Ben explains to the Mechamorph that he knows nothing, but it only continues to attack, and its teleportation ability causes the pair to carry the rest of their battle across the globe: after destroying part of Stonehenge, they nearly damage Christ the Redeemer in Rio de Janeiro and fight at the Great Pyramids in Egypt before arriving back in Bellwood. Ben transforms into Grey Matter and manages to escape the Mechamorph.

Meanwhile, Gwen and Grandpa Max receive a call from Ben's parents informing them that Ben is missing. They go in search of him only to find Tetrax. The three discover Azmuth's ship, but with no sign of Azmuth. Looking at the ship's log, they discover that Azmuth disguised it as a truck to track down and fix the malfunctioning Omnitrix, but crashed and was destroyed by the To'kustar. After escaping the Mechamorph, Ben as Grey Matter is mistaken as a small creature by his parents before Gwen, Grandpa Max and Tetrax soon encounter him back at his house. Tetrax restores Ben's Omnitrix to normal just as the Mechamorph catches up to them. Gwen deduces how the Omnitrix reacts after Ben returns to his human form and realize what has happened just as she, Ben, Tetrax and the Mechamorph are transported into the Omnitrix itself.

Inside, Ben and the Mechamorph continue to battle before being attacked by a swarm of Lepidopterrans (Stinkfly's species) just as Gwen and Tetrax are ambushed by a pack of Vulpimancers (Wildmutt's species). The four catch up with each other and they realize that the To'kustar is inside with them just as he resurfaces. The Mechamorph reveals himself as Azmuth's father, who attacks the To'kustar to avenge the death of his beloved son, while Gwen explains to Ben about the malfunction that she accidentally caused to the Omnitrix when she cast the dismantling spell on the robotic tank while Ben was attached to it. She uses Azmuth's father to reverse the transportation and return them all to Earth.

Azmuth's father pursues and fights the To'kustar, but the Omnitrix malfunctions again and transforms Ben's parents into a mindless Vulpimancer and a pyronite (Heatblast's species), causing Gwen to realize that the Omnitrix had transformed Azmuth into the very To'kustar they are fighting. Leaving Grandpa Max and Tetrax to fight his mutated parents, Ben and Gwen follow Azmuth's father and Azmuth to the city where Ben transforms into Way Big to battle Azmuth and hold off his father while he and Gwen try and reverse the accidental transformation, although the three-way battle causes massive damage (yet apparently without causing any civilian deaths) to the city in the process. Ben and Gwen finally convince Azmuth's father that his son is the To'kustar, and the three work together to help Azmuth regain control of himself via Gwen casting a nonverbal mind-based spell to bring back Azmuth's consciousness.

Now regaining his senses, Azmuth proceeds to use his father's Mechamorph abilities to fix the Omnitrix and subsequently allow it to return himself to normal. Azmuth reprimands Ben and Gwen for their errors and reveals that his father is actually a Galvan like him, wearing a Mechamorph-type enhanced armor that, as Azmuth reprimands him for as well, amplifies any anger of the user explaining his behavior. Hearing Azmuth explaining of how the Omnitrix was so filled with pink mana, Gwen wonders just what he is referring to, with Azmuth telling her that she will find out eventually. Returning to Ben's house, Azmuth restores Ben's parents to normal, albeit unconscious and their memories of grounding their son lost due to the effects of the transformation, and repairs the Rust Bucket, previously destroyed in the battle, before leaving to reconcile with his own father.

After Azmuth, his father and Tetrax are out of sight, Ben's parents regain consciousness and telling him to enjoy his fishing trip with Grandpa Max and Gwen. Ben declines, having learned to be more responsible then before and stays home to finish his history report for school. It ends with Ben, Gwen, and Grandpa Max on another road trip where they encounter Doctor Animo and the three prepare for another exciting battle of extraterrestrial, mystical, and highly advanced technological might yet again.

Cast
 Tara Strong as Benjamin Tennyson, Upgrade, Sandra Tennyson, Computer Voice
 Meagan Smith as Gwendolyn Tennyson, Female Student
 Paul Eiding as Maxwell Tennyson
 Steven Blum as Heatblast, Mechamorph
 David Fennoy as Tetrax Shard
 Richard McGonagle as Four Arms, Ben's Fifth grade Teacher
 Robert David Hall as Azmuth
 Dee Bradley Baker as Stinkfly, Wildmutt, Cash Murray, Carl Tennyson
 Adam Wylie as JT
 Richard Steven Horvitz as Grey Matter, Police Radio
 Jim Ward as Diamondhead
 Fred Tatasciore as Way Big, Evil Way Big
 Troy Baker as Azmuth's Father, Male Student
 Dwight Schultz as Dr. Animo

Crew
 Victor Cook - Director, Supervising producer
 Silas Hickey - Executive producer
 Marty Isenberg - Writer
 Collette Sunderman - Casting and Voice Director
 Turner Broadcasting System Asia Pacific - Creative animation director

To promote the film, a toy line manufactured by Bandai had been announced to launch around the same time the film premiered. Cartoon Network Asia and Philippines held a contest for one male and one female to be "immortalized in Ben 10 history." The two winners would receive "the ultimate voice over role," assorted prizes (clothing, toys, etc.) and a VIP limo ride to walk on the "green carpet" at the Ben 10: Destroy All Aliens premiere. A similar competition was held in Malaysia and the Middle East. Filipino viewers heard the Philippine winners while the rest of Southeast Asia will hear the Malaysian kids. The winners of the contest in Philippines were later revealed to be Nina Teo and Xander Ching who are voicing two of Ben's classmates. Cartoon Network Africa held a contest to win Green Movie Tickets to the exclusive premiere of the film in Johannesburg on March 10, 2012.

The film was later released on iTunes and other electronic-based stores, such as the PlayStation Store.

Home media
Madman Entertainment released Destroy All Aliens in Region 4 on June 20, 2012. Warner Home Video released the film in Region 2 on October 1, 2012. The film was also released in Region 1 on April 16, 2013.

Reception

Critical reviews
Emily Ashby of Common Sense Media gave Ben 10: Destroy All Aliens a 3 out of 5. Although criticizing on how much violence exists in the context of the story Ashby states that the story emphasizes the joy of family, even when that comes with rules a person does not like.

Nielsen ratings
In the United States, Ben 10: Destroy All Aliens increased by double digits across the board versus the same time period in 2011. The broadcast placed #1 in its time period in boys 2–11.

The film was watched by 2.080 million viewers with a 0.4 adult rating.

Awards
The film won the Best 3D Animated Program category at the Asian Television Awards 2012 as well as the Gold Award for Best Movie Campaign in the 2012 ProMax Awards. The award demonstrated the high level of animation talent on show in Asia and the talent available here, commented Sunny Saha from Turner International.

Notes
 Unlike the original series, Gwen's magical aura is colored shades of pink and magenta as it is in the three sequel series. Also, Way Big's appearance in this movie has the Alien Force/Ultimate Alien appearance. The reason is unknown, but maybe it aired during the two series' run since the first series was already finished three years ago.
 Though originally stated to not be canon, Derrick J. Wyatt later stated that the film is canon, and the destruction of the battle between Way Big and the evil Way Big led to aliens being brought in to rebuild the area, where they established their own society of Undertown as depicted in Ben 10: Omniverse.
 Nina Teo and Xander Ching are featured only in the Philippine version of the film.

See also

 Ben 10
 Ben 10: Secret of the Omnitrix
 Ben 10: Race Against Time
 Ben 10: Protector of Earth
 List of Ben 10 episodes

References

External links 
 Ben 10™ Destroy All Aliens - Australia
 Ben 10™ Destroy All Aliens - Asia
 Ben 10™ Destroy All Aliens - IMDB

2012 science fiction action films
2010s animated superhero films
Cartoon Network Studios animated films
2012 computer-animated films
Films based on television series
American science fiction action films
American children's animated action films
American children's animated science fiction films
American children's animated superhero films
Animated films about children
Films set in Egypt
Films set in Rio de Janeiro (city)
Films set in the United States
Ben 10 films
2012 films
2010s American animated films
Television films based on television series
Films directed by Victor Cook
Animated films based on animated series